Qudus Onikeku is a Nigerian dancer and performer who has been described as "an atypical artist". He was one of the three artists invited to Nigeria's first appearance at the 2017 Venice Biennale.

Biography and work 
Onikeku lived in France for a while before returning to Lagos to found Q-Dance Company and Dance Gathering Lagos. He has performed a number of local and international shows, including We Almost Forgot which has been showcased in Berlin and Lagos.

His work takes its influence from the Yoruba traditional culture "combining it with several other influences such as the guiding philosophies of hip hop, capoeira, and contemporary dance, to weave a certain understanding of the human condition." Onikeku's my exile is in my head was named as the laureate of the solo category at the Danse L’Afrique Danse 2010 in Bamako.

Notable Works 

SPIRIT CHILD premiered in Cologne in June 2019.

IYAMI premiered on 17 December 2018.

YUROPA premiered in Bremen in June 2018.

RAINMAKERS created for the 2018 TEDGlobal in Tanzania, and since performed severally in Nigeria.

A BRIEF MOMENT OF TRUTH created for the 2017 TEDLagos.

WE ALMOST FORGOT 2016 creation,  premièred in Berlin, Lagos and Abuja, and Paris.

QADDISH premiered on 6 July 2013 with several tours around Europe.

References 

Living people
Nigerian male dancers
Place of birth missing (living people)
1984 births